Edward James "Eddie" Hart (born April 24, 1949) is an American former track and field sprinter, winner of the gold medal in 4 × 100 m relay race at the 1972 Summer Olympics.

Born in Martinez, California, Eddie Hart won the NCAA championships in 100 yd in 1970 as a University of California student.

At the US Olympic Trials in 1972, both Hart and Rey Robinson repeated the world record, running the 100 m in 9.9 seconds, and were favored to win the race at the Olympic Games. But in Munich, they were both eliminated in the 100 m race because their coach, Stan Wright, unknowingly using an outdated Olympic schedule to determine the starting time of their quarterfinal heat, failed to deliver them to the track on time. This failure due to disorganization created much controversy. Hart also ran the anchoring leg in the American 4 × 100 m relay team, which won a gold medal and equalled the United States' own world record of 38.19.

Hart continued to run and in 1989 set the Masters world record in the 100 m that lasted for 14 years.

In 2017 Hart released a book, Disqualified: Eddie Hart, Munich 1972, and the Voices of the Most Tragic Olympics about his Olympic experience.

References

1949 births
Living people
American male sprinters
Athletes (track and field) at the 1972 Summer Olympics
Olympic gold medalists for the United States in track and field
People from Martinez, California
American masters athletes
Track and field athletes from California
Medalists at the 1972 Summer Olympics